is a Japanese historian and professor who has written a number of books about Japan and China. As of 2008 he is a professor of Chuo University's Faculty of Literature.

Biography
Born in 1952 in a town in Hiroshima Prefecture and raised in West Tokyo, he graduated in 1977 from Ritsumeikan University Faculty of Letters, Department of Oriental History. In 1979 he received a master's degree from Osaka University Graduate School of Letters. In 1983, he received his PhD degree from the same university, same department. After graduation, he became an associate professor, serving at the Hokkaido University of Education and then the University of Tsukuba (for history and anthropology). He received his current job in 2000.

Seo has authored a number of books, including The Urban Social Structure of Chang'an, 583-904, in 1983.

References

1952 births
Living people
Japanese sinologists
Japanese writers
People from Hiroshima
Ritsumeikan University alumni
Osaka University alumni